Augusta is the capital city of the U.S. state of Maine and the seat of Kennebec County.

The city's population was 18,899 at the 2020 census, making it the tenth-most populous city in Maine, and third-least populous state capital in the United States after Montpelier, Vermont, and Pierre, South Dakota.

Located on the Kennebec River at the head of tide, it is the principal city in the Augusta-Waterville micropolitan statistical area and home to the University of Maine at Augusta.

History

The area was first explored by the English of the short-lived Popham Colony in September 1607. 21 years later, English settlers from the Plymouth Colony settled in the area in 1628 as part of a trading post on the Kennebec River. The settlement was known by its Native American name Cushnoc (or Coussinoc or Koussinoc), meaning "head of the tide." Fur trading was at first profitable, but because of Native uprisings and declining revenues, Plymouth Colony sold the Kennebec Patent in 1661. Cushnoc would remain unoccupied for the next 75 years.

The area around Cushnoc was inhabited by the Kennebec, a band of the larger Abenaki nation. During the 17th century, they were on friendly terms with the English settlers in the region.

A hotbed of Abenaki hostility toward British settlements was located further up the Kennebec at Norridgewock. In 1722, the tribe and its allies attacked Fort Richmond (now Richmond) and destroyed Brunswick. In response, English forces sacked Norridgewock in 1724 during Dummer's War, when the English gained tentative control of the Kennebec.

During the height of the French and Indian War, in 1754, the English colonists built a blockhouse named Fort Western at Cushnoc on the eastern bank of the Kennebec River. It was intended as a supply depot for Fort Halifax upriver, as well as a regional defense from French attack. Later, during the American Revolutionary War, Benedict Arnold and his 1,100 troops would use Fort Western as a staging area before continuing their journey up the Kennebec to the Battle of Quebec.

Cushnoc was incorporated as part of Hallowell in 1771. Known as "the Fort", it was set off and incorporated by the Massachusetts General Court in February 1797 as Harrington. In August, however, the name was changed to Augusta after Pamela Augusta Dearborn, daughter of Henry Dearborn. In 1799, it was designated as the county seat for the newly created Kennebec County.

Maine became a state in 1820 as a result of the Missouri Compromise. Augusta was designated as its capital in 1827, over the current capital of Portland, and rival communities Brunswick and Hallowell. The Maine State Legislature continued meeting in Portland, however, until the completion of the Maine State House in 1832, designed by Charles Bulfinch. Augusta was incorporated as a city in 1849. After being named the state capital and the introduction of new industry, the city flourished. In 1840 and 1850, the city ranked among the 100 largest urban populations in the country. During the next decade, however, the city was quickly bypassed by rapidly growing metropolizes in the Midwest.

Excellent soil provided for agriculture, and water power from streams provided for the industry. In 1837, a dam was built across the Kennebec where the falls drop 15  feet at the head of a tide. By 1838, 10 sawmills were contracted. With the arrival of the Kennebec & Portland Railroad in 1851, Augusta became an even more productive mill town. In 1883, the property of A. & W. Sprague Company was purchased by the Edwards Manufacturing Company, which erected extensive brick mills for manufacturing cotton textiles. They imported cotton from the South for processing and export to Europe. In the late 19th century, a paper and pulp plant was constructed.

Other Augusta firms produced lumber, sash, doors, window shutters, broom handles, stone cutters' tools, shoes, headstones, ice and furniture. The city developed as a publishing and shipping center. Today, government and post-secondary education are important businesses.

Since the mid-eighteenth century, there has been a military presence in Augusta. Fort Western has not had troops garrisoned there since the 1790s, but in 1828, the U.S. Government built an arsenal to protect their interests from Britain. During the Civil War, Augusta was a rendezvous point for Union soldiers traveling to the front. Many of the soldiers camped on the green in front of the capitol building. In 1862, Camp E.D. Keyes was established in the northwestern portion of the city.

During World War I, Camp Keyes was used as a mobilization and training camp for soldiers. The camp eventually became a headquarters for the Maine National Guard. In 1929, the state legislature approved the placement of the Augusta State Airport next to the camp. As the airport grew, the use of the camp as a training facility was no longer possible. Today, it is still used for administrative and logistical purposes by the National Guard.

In the 19th century, Augusta got a regular steamboat service and the railroad. The city installed gas lights in 1859. A telephone service was available in 1880 and a local hospital in 1898. In the early 20th century, Augusta built two movie houses and a film production studio.

Downtown revitalization
For much of Augusta's history, the central business district was on and near Water Street on the west bank of the Kennebec River. The street, laid out in the late 1700s, was the location of the area's commercial and industrial life. Many fires damaged this concentrated area, including one in 1865 that destroyed nearly 100 buildings. In 1890, the first trolley line began operation down Water Street, connecting Augusta with Gardiner and Hallowell to the south.

In 1932, buses replaced the trolley line. With the completion of the Maine Turnpike and Interstate 95 in 1955, local commercial developments began to move away from Water Street and closer to the highway. Among the results was a storefront vacancy rate downtown of about 60 percent.

Since the late 2000s, there has been a renewed and ongoing focus by city officials, the Augusta Downtown Alliance, and private developers to revitalize the downtown area.

Geography

Augusta is drained by Bond's Brook, Woromontogus Stream and the Kennebec River.

Roads

The city is crossed by Interstate 95, U.S. Route 201, State Route 11, U.S. Route 202, State Route 9, State Route 3, State Route 100, State Route 27, State Route 8, State Route 104, and State Route 105.

Bordering
Augusta borders the towns of Manchester to its west, Sidney and Vassalboro to its north, Windsor to its east, Chelsea to its south, and the city of Hallowell to its southwest.

Climate
Augusta's climate is classified as a humid continental climate (Köppen: Dfb). Summers are typically warm, rainy, and humid, while winters are cold, windy, and snowy. Spring and fall are usually mild, but conditions are widely varied, depending on wind direction and jet stream positioning.

Most snowfall occurs from December through March. There is usually little or no snow in April and November, and snow is rare in May and October.

Demographics

2010 census
As of the census of 2010, there were 19,136 people, 8,802 households, and 4,490 families residing in the city. The racial makeup of the city was 94.1% White, 1.1% African American, 0.7% Native American, 1.5% Asian, 0.1% Pacific Islander, 0.4% from other races, and 2.3% from two or more races. Hispanic or Latino of any race were 1.8% of the population.

There were 8,802 households, of which 23.0% had children under the age of 18 living with them, 35.2% were married couples living together, 11.8% had a female householder with no husband present, 4.0% had a male householder with no wife present, and 49.0% were non-families. 39.8% of all households were made up of individuals, and 13.6% had someone living alone who was 65 years of age or older. The average household size was 2.08 and the average family size was 2.76.

The median age in the city was 43.2 years. 18.3% of residents were under the age of 18; 8.1% were between the ages of 18 and 24; 26% were from 25 to 44; 29.4% were from 45 to 64; and 18% were 65 years of age or older. The gender makeup of the city was 48.6% male and 51.4% female.

2000 census
As of the census of 2000, there were 18,560 people, 8,565 households, and 4,607 families residing in the city. The racial makeup of the city was 96.21% White, 0.50% Black or African American, 0.48% Native American, 1.35% Asian, 0.01% Pacific Islander, 0.16% from other races, and 1.3% from two or more races. 0.86% of the population were Hispanic or Latino of any race.

There were 8,565 households, out of which 24.3% had children under the age of 18 living with them, 39.1% were married couples living together, 10.9% had a female householder with no husband present, and 46.2% were non-families. 38.3% of all households were made up of individuals, and 14.2% had someone living alone who was 65 years of age or older. The average household size was 2.10 and the average family size was 2.77.

In the city, the population was spread out, with 20.5% under the age of 18, 8.7% from 18 to 24, 28.3% from 25 to 44, 24.8% from 45 to 64, and 17.7% who were 65 years of age or older. The median age was 40 years. For every 100 females, there were 89.9 males. For every 100 females age 18 and over, there were 87.5 males.

The median income for a household in the city was $29,921, and the median income for a family was $42,230. Males had a median income of $31,209 versus $22,548 for females. The per capita income for the city was $19,145. About 11.4% of families and 15.0% of the population were below the poverty line, including 19.2% of those under age 18 and 9.8% of those age 65 or over.

Government

Local government

Augusta is governed by a mayor and council-manager system. The City Council oversees all City government activities and establishes the legislative policies of the city, adopts and amends ordinances and local laws, appropriates municipal resources, and sets the tax rate. The City Manager serves as the chief executive officer and purchasing agent of the city. The mayor presides at all meetings of the council, and is recognized ceremonially as the official head of the city.

The city maintains a police department; it is remarkable for not having had an officer killed in the line of duty for over a century.

Political makeup

Augusta has historically been Democratic. In the 2012 presidential election, Barack Obama received 5,192 of the votes to Mitt Romney's 3,339. 
In the 2020 presidential election, Joe Biden won 5,248 votes to Donald Trump's 4,155.

The city has not voted for a Republican presidential candidate since George H. W. Bush in the Republican landslide of 1988. Democrats are the majority political affiliation in all four voting wards. There are more voters who are not enrolled than there are registered Republicans in the City.

Voter registration

Education

There are five public schools, one private school, and one college (the University of Maine at Augusta). There are two public libraries in Augusta.

Farrington, Gilbert, Hussey, and Lincoln are the four public elementary schools that are located in the city.

Cony serves students in grades 7–12 from Augusta and the surrounding towns; Cony comprises Cony Middle School and Cony High School.

St. Michaels is a private Catholic school; it charges tuition to its students.

The University of Maine at Augusta is third-largest university in the University of Maine System.

The Maine State Library and Lithgow Public Library are both located in Augusta.

Media

Printed media

Kennebec Journal, daily newspaper for capital area
Uncle Henry's, weekly classified adverts publication

Radio

WJZN, oldies
WMDR, religious
WMME-FM, top-40
WTOS-FM, rock
WVQM, talk
WWTP, religious

Television
Augusta is part of the Portland, Maine television market, and receives most of that market's channels. WCBB channel 10, licensed to Augusta, is the local television outlet for the Maine Public Broadcasting Network.

Transportation
Interstate 95 runs by the western outskirts of Augusta. U.S. 202 runs east-west through the city. U.S. 201 runs north-south through the city.

Augusta State Airport in the western part of the city has commercial flights.

Sites of interest
Blaine House
Fort Western
Holocaust and Human Rights Center of Maine at the University of Maine at Augusta
Lithgow Public Library
Maine State House
Maine State Museum
Viles Arboretum

Notable people

Ambrose Abbott, state legislator
Martha Ballard, midwife
James G. Blaine, Secretary of State and presidential nominee
Horatio Bridge, navy officer
Julia Clukey, 2010 Olympic luger
Beverly Daggett, President of the Maine Senate
Olive E. Dana, short-story writer, essayist, poet
Melville Fuller, Chief Justice of the United States Supreme Court 
George Huntington Hartford, owned the Great Atlantic and Pacific Tea Company, the country's largest food retailer at the time of his death
John F. Hill, former Maine governor
Robert Deniston Hume, Oregon politician and businessman
Eastman Johnson, artist
Roger Katz, mayor of Augusta and state legislator
George W. Ladd, U.S. congressman
Dorianne Laux, poet
Sumner Lipman, state legislator and attorney
Ben Lucas, football player
Henry A. McMasters, recipient of the Medal of Honor
Rachel Nichols, actress
Frederick G. Payne, Mayor of Augusta and 60th governor of Maine
David Peoples, athlete and golfer
Frederick W. Plaisted, mayor of Augusta, 48th governor of Maine
John F. Potter, U.S. congressman, judge
Travis Roy, hockey player
Luther Severance, publisher, U.S. congressman and senator
Olympia Snowe, U.S. senator
John L. Stevens, U.S. minister to Kingdom of Hawaii, accused of attempting to overthrow Hawaiian queen, 1893
Manch Wheeler, quarterback with the Buffalo Bills
Gil Whitney, television news anchorman and meteorologist
Reuel Williams, U.S. senator
Willard G. Wyman, general

See also

USS Augusta, 2 ships

References

External links

City of Augusta, Maine
Lithgow Public Library
University of Maine at Augusta
Epodunk City Profile

Down East, March 2020. Wright, Virginia M. "Best Places to Live in Maine: Augusta; A new crop of downtown entrepreneurs has a message: Don’t Dis ’Gusta," 

 
Cities in Maine
Cities in Kennebec County, Maine
County seats in Maine
Populated places established in 1629
1629 establishments in the Thirteen Colonies